His Young Heart is a four track EP by Daughter which was self-released by the band on 20 April 2011. It was re-released on July 3, 2012, on Glassnote Records who pressed it on 10" vinyl and made it available as a download. The cover image is an old family photograph of singer Elena Tonra. Tonra and Haefeli recorded this together as drummer Remi would join them later in the year.

Track listing

Personnel
 Elena Tonra - Vocals, Guitar, Accordion, Producer
 Igor Haefeli - Electric Guitar, Vocals, Drums, Bass, Glockenspiel, Producer

References

Daughter (band) albums
2011 EPs
Glassnote Records EPs